Born for the Road is the tenth studio album by English-Irish country singer Nathan Carter. It was released in Ireland on 12 October 2018 by Sharpe Music. The album peaked at number 3 on the Irish Albums Chart. The album includes the singles "Give It to Me" and "Winnie O'Neill".

Singles
"Give It to Me" was released as the lead single from the album on 3 May 2018. "Winnie O'Neill" was released as the second single from the album on 23 July 2018.

Track listing

Charts

Release history

References

2018 albums
Nathan Carter albums